Maqsood Mahmood Ali (born 19 September 1958), better known as Lucky Ali, is an Indian singer, songwriter and actor. With several popular singles and albums, he emerged as a significant figure of Indipop during the 1990s.

Early life and education
Ali is the second of the eight children of Bollywood actor, Mehmood Ali.  His mother Mahelaka, was part Bengali and part Pashtun, and the sister of 1960s Indian actress Meena Kumari. The Bollywood actress and dancer, Minoo Mumtaz, is his paternal aunt. He attended City Montessori School, Convent of Jesus and Mary, Hampton Court, Mussoorie, Manekji Cooper (Kindergarten) (Juhu), Bombay Scottish School in Mumbai, and the Bishop Cotton Boys' School, Bangalore.

Personal life
Ali has two children with his first wife – Ta'awwuz and Tasmiyah. He then married Inaya (Anahita, a Persian). With her, he has two children: Sara and Raiyan. He married a third time in 2010 to British model and former beauty queen Kate Elizabeth Hallam whom he divorced in 2017. The couple have a son named Dani Maqsood Ali.
Ali presently lives on the outskirts of Bengaluru in his farm house. His favourite places are Mecca and Medina.

Ali and his father shared a tempestuous relationship. Mehmood Ali was a very busy actor in the 1960s and 70s, and remained away from home for his shoots. Once, around the age of four when Ali first returned from boarding school, Mehmood and the entire family had come to receive Ali after 10 months in boarding school, at the airport. Ali did not recognize his father, but on seeing him said, "He's the film comedian Mehmood!" Ali lived away from his family in a boarding school in Dehradun, Mussoorie. Ali's tryst with marijuana led Mehmood to write the script of the movie Dushman Duniya Ka (Enemy of the World). The movie stars Ali's youngest brother, Manzoor. It is the story of the drug abuse of a young man called Lucky. In the end, the young man kills his mother, destroys everything around him and is then killed by his father. Ali differed with his father's vision and did not act in the movie. "I felt the story lacked hope," he said. However, he sang his first song for the film.

Best known for his music, singing and acting, Ali has also bred horses, worked on an oil rig off the coast of Pondicherry in South India, cleaned and sold carpets and is a farmer with a strong opinion on organic methods in farming.

Personal albums
Ali made his debut on the Indian music scene with the album Sunoh, which established him as a singer. This album won many of the top awards in Indian music, including the Best Pop Male Vocalist at the 1996 Screen Awards and the Channel V Viewers Choice Award in 1997. It stayed on the MTV Asia Charts in the top three for 60 weeks. The song "O Sanam" from Sunoh launched his career. It was also nominated at the 1997 MTV Video Music Awards His next album, Sifar, was noted for its music, lyrics and vocals.

Ali became known for his distinctive music style and also for his untrained voice - elements that helped him emerge as a leading figure in Indipop during the period. His third and fourth albums were Aks and Kabhi Aisa Lagta Hai, both of which were reasonably successful.
He is also known for contributing the song "Anjaani Raahon Mein" to the album Meri Jaan Hindustan, which commemorated 50 years of Indian independence in the year 1997. The video was directed by Mani Shankar, and features him as a young rural man working in a foreign country, with a longing to go back home, and his joy of actually returning to a place he loved. When asked about the video, he once said "The video of 'Anjaani Raahon Mein' was a beautiful story in itself. It was done straight from the heart and it is very special to me."

Bollywood career
Ali debuted in Bollywood with the song "Nasha Nasha" in the movie Dushman Duniya Ka. After that he sung “Ek Pal Ka Jeena” and "Na Tum Jaano Na Hum", featured in Kaho Naa... Pyaar Hai (2000). He received the 2001 Filmfare Award for Best Male Playback Singer for "Ek Pal Ka Jeena" song. He was nominated for the Best Playback Singer Male for "Aa Bhi Jaa", featured in Sur in the 48th Filmfare Awards, but lost to Sonu Nigam. He has lent his voice to films such as Sur (2003), Bachna Ae Haseeno (2008), Anjaana Anjaani (2010) and Tamasha (2015).

Playback singing career
Lucky Ali started his playback singing career with the song "Walking All Alone" from the film Ek Baap Chhe Bete in 1978. This film starred Mehmood Ali and his six sons. Ali's second song was "Nasha Nasha" from the film Dushman Duniya Ka, which starred his brother Manzoor Ali in the lead role. The film was directed by their father Mehmood.

He has worked with composers such as A.R Rahman, Vishal Bhardwaj, Vishal–Shekhar, Mikey McCleary, Prashant Pillai, Varun Ahuja and Rajiv Bhalla.

Acting career

As the nephew of Meena Kumari and son of Mehmood, Lucky Ali did not lack the requisites to make his debut as an actor. He first appeared in Chote Nawab ("The Little Prince") in 1962, directed by Mehmood. He acted in a few films in the 1970s and 1980s such as Yehi Hai Zindagi (1977), Hamare Tumhare (1979) and Shyam Benegal's Trikaal (1985). He also acted in the television series Bharat Ek Khoj, directed by Shyam Benegal. After a long break from acting, he returned in Sanjay Gupta's Kaante (2002), in which he acted alongside leading stars Amitabh Bachchan, Sanjay Dutt, Kumar Gaurav and Suniel Shetty. Ali also acted in the TV serial Zara Hatke. In 2002, he acted in the Hindi musical Sur-The Melody of Life playing a complex role.

Discography

Ali's discography contains six studio albums, six compilations, seven singles, 19 soundtracks, two concert tours and two other albums (as a composer).

Studio albums

Soundtrack

Filmography

Films

Television series

See also 
 Mehmood Ali Family

References

External links

 Lucky Ali's Official Website
 

1958 births
Living people
Bollywood playback singers
Male actors in Hindi cinema
Indian male film actors
Indian male playback singers
Indian male pop singers
Indian male singer-songwriters
Indian singer-songwriters
Indian male television actors
Bishop Cotton Boys' School alumni
Telugu playback singers
20th-century Indian male actors
21st-century Indian male actors
Singers from Mumbai
Male actors from Mumbai
Indian folk-pop singers
Filmfare Awards winners
Screen Awards winners
Zee Cine Awards winners
International Indian Film Academy Awards winners
20th-century Indian composers
21st-century Indian composers
20th-century Indian male singers
20th-century Indian singers
21st-century Indian male singers
21st-century Indian singers